The Lord Mayor of Budapest was a former political position, existed between 1873 and 1944 (or 1945) in Budapest, the capital of Hungary. The Lord Mayor was representative of the Hungarian government as head of the capital's municipal authority, similarly to the Lord-Lieutenants of Counties.

Since 1990, the position of Mayor of Budapest is domestically also known as "Lord Mayor" to distinguish the office from that of the mayors that lead each of Budapest's 23 districts.

Sources

External links
 Budapest korábbi polgármesterei és főpolgármesterei, budapest.hu

 
1873 establishments in Hungary
1945 disestablishments in Hungary